Shaolin Rescuers a.k.a. "Avenging Warriors of Shaolin" is a Shaw Brothers film directed by Chang Cheh. It is one of the Shoalin Temple themed martial arts films and the adventures of the Shaolin hero Hung Si-Kuan starring the Venom Mob and Jason Pai Piao.

Plot

The film opens with a number of figures battling with Priest Pai Mei and Gao Chin-Chung (Lu Feng). During the fight, famous Shaolin heroes San Te and Fong Sai-Yuk are killed, while Hung Si-Kuan (Jason Pai Piao) narrowly escapes.

Chun Ah-Chin (Lo Mang) is a local bean curd maker who uses the mantis style and likes to spar with his friend Ying Cha-Po (Kuo Chui), a waiter who can use anything as a weapon, particularly a bowl and a pair of chopsticks. Although the two both work menial jobs with which they are unhappy, they dream of one day becoming great heroes and dying for noble causes.  Chu Tsai (Sun Chien) is a light skill student at a local school who is constantly abused by his master and a fellow student (Ku Kuan Chung),  He ends up befriending Ah-Chun and Cha-Po after they save him from getting beat by his fellow students.

Meanwhile, Pai Mei, Gao Chin-Chung and his fighting men arrive at a temple looking for the injured Hung Si-Kuan and end up in a fight with the monks and Han Chi (Chiang Sheng). Han Chi escapes but the monks are killed, so Chi goes looking for Hung Si-Kuan. Meanwhile, Hung has arrived at Chu Tsai's school, as the master is an old comrade. However, the teacher rejects Hung’s request for help and immediately reports to Gao.

Chu Tsai, Ah-Chun and Cha-Po find the injured Hung Si-Kuan and they conjure up schemes to get him medicine. Once healed, Hung Si-Kuan thanks the three by teaching them special techniques to perfect their skills. Han Chi also meets up with the four after helping them in a fight at Cha-Po’s restaurant.

However, Chu Tsai's fellow student had spotted Chu purchasing the medicine for Hung. He reports this to Gao Chin-Chung, and leads the Wu-Tang Clan to Hung Si-Kuan’s hiding place. Hung and company escape and hide in an old temple. Although they are trapped, Gao decides to wait until dawn to attack, so as not to risk one of the fugitives escaping in the dark.

Morning arrives and Gao Chin-Chung attacks.  Although Gao and his men are all killed, Chu Tsai is killed in the battle while Ah-Chin and Cha-Po are mortally wounded.  With government troops on the way, Ah-chin and Cha-po volunteer to stay behind and occupy the troops so that Han Chi and Hung Si-Kuan can escape.  The film ends as the two realize they have achieved their dream: Dying for a noble cause.

Cast
Jason Pai Piao – Hung Si-Kuan
Lu Feng – Gao Chin-Chung
Lo Mang – Chen Ah-Chin
Chiang Sheng – Han Chi
Kuo Chui - Ying Cha-Po
Sun Chien - Chu Tsai
Ku Kuan Chung – student
Wang Li – Brother Wang
Yang Hsuing – Fan Tian-Cong
Yu Tai Ping - Zhou Feng
Tony Tam Jan Dung – Tiger kid
Lau Shi Kwong– Leopard kid
Teekay Miknighton - opening credits

External links
 

1979 films
Kung fu films
Hong Kong martial arts films
Shaw Brothers Studio films
Films directed by Chang Cheh
Funimation
Films set in 18th-century Qing dynasty
1970s Hong Kong films